Renato Del Ponte (21 December 1944 – 5 February 2023) was an Italian essayist, teacher, and translator.

Biography
Born in Lodi on 21 December 1944, Del Ponte studied classical studies at the University of Genoa. After the death of Julius Evola on 11 June 1974, his ashes were scattered by Del Ponte and Eugène David off of a cliff face on Monte Rosa. Two years prior, Del Ponte had become editor-in-chief of the magazine Arthos.

Renato Del Ponte died in Fivizzano on 5 February 2023 at the age of 78.

Works
Dei e miti italici: archetipi e forme della sacralità romano-italica (1985)
Il movimento tradizionalista romano nel '900 (1987)
La religione dei Romani (1992)
Evola e il magico Gruppo di Ur (1994)
I Liguri: etnogenesi di un popolo (1999)
La città degli Dei: la tradizione di Roma e la sua continuità (2003)
Favete Linguis!: saggi sulle fondamenta del Sacro in Roma antica (2010)
Ambrosiae pocula (2011)
Nella terra del drago: note insolite di viaggio nel regno del Bhutan (2012)

Awards
Premio "Isola d'Elba" (1992)
Premio "Cinque Terre - riviera ligure" (2000)
"Trofeo Premio Liguria" (2020)

References

1944 births
2023 deaths
Italian schoolteachers
Italian translators
University of Genoa alumni
People from Lodi, Lombardy